Eneko Arieta-Araunabeña Piedra (21 August 1933 – 27 December 2004), known as Arieta, was a Spanish footballer who played as a forward.

Club career
Born in Durango, Biscay, Arieta joined Athletic Bilbao in 1951 from neighbouring CD Getxo. Barred by the likes of Agustín Gaínza, Rafael Iriondo, José Luis Panizo, Venancio and Telmo Zarra, he appeared in only two La Liga games in his first two seasons, but scored in his debut on 9 September 1951, a 4–2 home win against Sporting de Gijón.

After the arrival of new coach Ferdinand Daučík before the start of 1954–55, several veterans began being gradually replaced, and Arieta succeeded Zarra as team top scorer, netting 20 times in 28 matches during the campaign and also winning the Copa del Generalísimo against Sevilla FC. He added 15 goals the following season, helping his team conquer the sixth national championship of their history.

On 29 June 1958, Arieta opened the scoring in the Spanish Cup final, helping defeat hosts Real Madrid 2–0 and winning the second of his third trophies in the tournament. He retired in 1966 at the age of 32, having collected overall totals of 302 appearances and 170 goals, and died in Galdakao at 71 due to illness.

International career
Arieta won three caps for Spain, all in 1955 friendlies. His debut came on 17 March in a 1–2 defeat to France in Madrid, and he scored in the following two appearances, in Switzerland (3–0) and against England (4–1 loss at Wembley Stadium).

Personal life
Arieta's younger brother, Antón, was also a footballer and a forward. He too played for Athletic, and as the pair shared teams for two years, they were known as Arieta I and Arieta II.

Honours
Athletic Bilbao
La Liga: 1955–56
Copa del Generalísimo: 1955, 1956, 1958

See also
List of one-club men

References

External links

1933 births
2004 deaths
People from Durango, Biscay
Sportspeople from Biscay
Spanish footballers
Footballers from the Basque Country (autonomous community)
Association football forwards
La Liga players
CD Getxo players
Athletic Bilbao footballers
Spain B international footballers
Spain international footballers